Léon Epin (30 October 1858 – 3 July 1928) was a French archer. He competed at the 1920 Summer Olympics, winning three medals, two silver and a bronze.

References

1858 births
1928 deaths
French male archers
Olympic archers of France
Archers at the 1920 Summer Olympics
Sportspeople from Meurthe-et-Moselle
Olympic silver medalists for France
Olympic bronze medalists for France
Olympic medalists in archery
Medalists at the 1920 Summer Olympics